Best of Live is the second live album by Serbian rock band Bajaga i Instruktori, released in 2002.

The album was recorded in 2002 on the band's concerts in Belgrade, Ljubljana, Zagreb, Timișoara, Skopje, and Niš. It features two previously unrecorded songs: a song in Slovenian, "Slovenačka reč", recorded live, featuring music from the band's old song "Idem (Kao da ne idem, a idem)" and lyrics written by Slovenian journalist Sonja Javorik, and a song in Macedonian, "Pesna protiv maleri", recorded in studio for the theatre play Kutrite mali hrčki by Skopje Drama Theatre.

Track listing
"Godine prolaze" - 4:29
"Najave" - 1:45
"Gospod brine" - 6:16
"Plavi safir" - 5:08
"Grad" – 4:53
"Na vrhovima prstiju" - 4:08
"Tišina" - 7:03
"Vesela pesma" - 3:52
"442 do Beograda" - 5:18
"Ruski voz" - 5:11
"Otkada tebe volim" - 5:21
"Da li da odem ili ne" - 3:25
"Ti se ljubiš (Na tako dobar način)" - 4:22
"Slovenačka reč" - 4:15
"Pesna protiv maleri" - 4:06

Personnel
Momčilo Bajagić - vocals, guitar
Žika Milenković - vocals, guitar
Miroslav Cvetković - bass guitar
Saša Lokner - keyboards
Ljubiša Opačić - guitar
Čeda Macura - drums

References 
 EX YU ROCK enciklopedija 1960-2006,  Janjatović Petar;  

Bajaga i Instruktori live albums
2002 live albums
Albums recorded in Slovenia